The Argentine presidential election of 1862 was held on 4 September to choose the first president of Argentina. Bartolomé Mitre was elected president.

Background
These elections were all indirectly decided in the electoral college, and not reflective of popular vote (whose turnout averaged 10% of male suffrage). The cosmetic nature of this electoral system, which became known locally as the voto cantado (the "vote song," for its predetermined script), resulted from a period of intermittent civil wars between those who favored a united Argentina with a strong central government (Unitarians) and Buenos Aires Province leaders who favored an independent nation of their own (Federalists). These conflicts had dominated local political life since 1820, and did not immediately subside with the enactment of the Argentine Constitution of 1853.

The military guarantor of the Argentine Confederation, General Justo José de Urquiza, lost control over his appointed successor, Santiago Derqui, and this led Buenos Aires Governor Bartolomé Mitre to take up arms in defense of autonomy against what he saw as Derqui's reneging on their 1860 gentlemen's agreement. Victorious at the 1861 Battle of Pavón, Mitre obtained important concessions from the national army - notably the amendment of the Constitution to provide for indirect elections through an electoral college comprised - by design - somewhat disproportionately of electors from the nation's hinterland provinces.

A skilled negotiator, Mitre placated restive sentiment in Buenos Aires and Entre Ríos Provinces (where separatist sentiment was highest), and nominated Marcos Paz, a Federalist and former Mitre foe, as his running mate. Arranging an electoral college election on 4 September 1862, he and Paz received the body's unanimous support.

Results

Results by Province

Notes

References

 

1862 elections in South America
1862 in Argentina
1862
Single-candidate elections
Elections in Argentina